Mulligan is a settlement in Newfoundland and Labrador, 66 km northeast of Happy Valley - Goose Bay. The settlement has a population of less than 100 people, and receives few visitors aside from Moose and Ptarmigan hunters.

Populated places in Labrador